Malvan taluka is a taluka in Sindhudurg district of Maharashtra, a state in Western India.

References

Talukas in Sindhudurg district
Talukas in Maharashtra